This is a list of adult nonfiction books that topped The New York Times Nonfiction Best Seller list in 1932. When the list began in 1931 though 1941 it only reflected sales in the New York City area.

See also

 1932 in literature
 The New York Times Fiction Best Sellers of 1932
 Lists of The New York Times Fiction Best Sellers
 Lists of The New York Times Nonfiction Best Sellers
 Publishers Weekly list of bestselling novels in the United States in the 1930s

References 

The New York Times Best Seller list